Hamouriyah, also spelled Hamoryah, Hamouria, Hammurah or Hammuriya, is a village in Syria. It is administratively a part of the Kafr Batna nahiyah, in the Markaz district of the Rif Dimashq Governorate.

References

Populated places in Markaz Rif Dimashq District
Suburbs of Damascus